Tatvan railway station is located in the town of Tatvan, Turkey in eastern Anatolia. It is one of two railway stations serving the town, the other one being Tatvan Pier.

Opened in 1964 by the Turkish State Railways, it is serviced by a twice-weekly intercity train, the Van Lake Express  to Ankara, as well as a daily regional train to Elazığ.

References

Railway stations in Bitlis Province
Railway stations opened in 1964
Transport in Bitlis Province